New Eton College (NEC) was founded in 1932 and is a private secondary school in Rose Hill, Mauritius.

It provides education to the boys of Rose Hill and surrounding region. 

Some students of New Eton College have been "Laureates" at the end of their Higher School Certificate (Mauritius) examinations. 

During the 1975 Mauritian student protests riot police arrested a number of students of New Eton College.

See also
 List of secondary schools in Mauritius 
 Education in Mauritius

References

Schools in Mauritius
Educational institutions established in 1932
1932 establishments in Mauritius